ZES may stand for:

  ZENworks Endpoint Security Management, a computing-security product 
 Zollinger–Ellison syndrome, a disease of the digestive system
 ZES (television channel), a Belgian television channel